Vodovozov, or Vodovozova (feminine form), is a Russian surname and may refer to:

Elizaveta Vodovozova (1844–1923), Russian children's writer, educational theorist and memoirist 
Vasily Vodovozov (1825–1926), Russian children's writer, poet, pedagogue, educational theorist
Yury Vodovozov (born 1982), retired Belarusian professional footballer